The year 1997 was the 26th year after the independence of Bangladesh. It was also the second year of the first term of the Government of Sheikh Hasina.

Incumbents

 President: Shahabuddin Ahmed
 Prime Minister: Sheikh Hasina
 Chief Justice: A.T.M Afzal

Demography

Climate

Cyclone
A powerful cyclone caused widespread damage and loss of life throughout Bangladesh in May. Originating from a near-equatorial trough on 15 May 1997, the cyclone tracked in a general northward direction throughout its existence. The system gradually intensified over the following days, reaching the equivalent of a Category 1 hurricane on the Saffir–Simpson scale by 17 May. The following day, the storm attained its peak intensity with winds of 215 km/h (135 mph) according to the JTWC and 165 km/h (105 mph) according to the IMD along with a barometric pressure of 964 mbar (hPa; 28.47 inHg). On 19 May, the cyclone made landfall near Chittagong, Bangladesh before rapidly dissipating the next day.

Economy

Note: For the year 1997 average official exchange rate for BDT was 43.89 per US$.

Events
 13 April – Bangladesh national cricket team wins 1997 ICC Trophy and qualifies for cricket world cup 1999.
 21 November– 23 people were killed in Chittagong when a five-story building collapsed in Bangladesh during an earthquake.
 2 December – The 'Chittagong Hill tracts Peace Accord' is signed between Bangladesh government and Parbatya Chattagram Jana Sanghati Samiti.
 7 December – Over a hundred people are injured during a demonstrations against the signing of peace accord with rebels in the Chittagong Hill Tracts.

Awards and Recognitions

Independence Day Award

Ekushey Padak
Abu Ishaque (literature)
Novera Ahmed (sculpture)
Nitun Kundu (sculpture)
Debu Bhattacharya (music)
Runu Biswas (dance)
 Razia Khan (education)
 Serajul Huq (education)
 Shabnam Mustari (music)
Santosh Gupta (journalism)
 Monajatuddin (journalism)
Momtazuddin Ahmed (drama)

Sports
 International football:
 Bangladesh participated in 1997 South Asian Football Federation Gold Cup held in Nepal, where they exited in the group stage.
 Domestic football:
 Muktijoddha Sangsad KC won Dhaka League title while Mohammedan SC became runner-up.
 Abahani Ltd. won the title of Bangladesh Federation Cup while Arambagh KS became runner-up.
Cricket:

 The third and final SAARC Quadrangular was held in Dhaka in February 1997. The Pakistan 'A' team, led by Asif Mujtaba, won the trophy after beating India 'A' in a rain affected final. Bangladesh could not win any matches in this tournament.
 The 1997 ICC Trophy played in Kuala Lumpur, Malaysia between 24 March and 13 April 1997 was the qualification tournament for the 1999 Cricket World Cup. Bangladesh, captained by Akram Khan (pictured), were the winners of the tournament, defeating Kenya in the final, while Scotland won the third place play-off. These three teams took the three available spots in the World Cup, Bangladesh and Scotland both qualifying for this tournament for the first time.
 The Bangladesh national cricket team toured New Zealand in November and December 1997 and played four first-class and four List A matches against teams representing the northern, central and southern regions of New Zealand. Bangladesh had been playing List A matches since 1986, but the four first-class matches on this tour were the first first-class matches played by any Bangladeshi team. However, Bangladesh team was not competitive in the longer version of the game against the stronger NZ regional teams.

Births
 25 October – Mehedy Hasan Miraz, cricketer

Deaths
 4 January – Akhteruzzaman Elias, author (b. 1943)
 4 January – A R Mallick, academician (b. 1918)
 8 July – Abu Sadat Mohammad Sayem, first Chief Justice of Bangladesh, subsequently President of Bangladesh (b. 1916)
 26 September – Mafizuddin Ahmed, scientist (b. 1921)
 4 November – Ranesh Das Gupta, writer, journalist, and politician (b. 1912)
 1 December – Khan Ataur Rahman, singer, actor, and film director (b. 1928)

See also 
 1990s in Bangladesh
 List of Bangladeshi films of 1997
 Timeline of Bangladeshi history

References

 
Bangladesh
Bangladesh